Half Chance may refer to:

Half Chance, Alabama
Half Chance Iron Bridge